The following is a list of full-power radio stations, HD Radio subchannels and low-power translators in the United States broadcasting K-Love programming, which can be sorted by their call signs, frequencies, city of license, state and broadcast area.
Blue background indicates a low-power FM translator.
Gray background indicates an HD Radio subchannel.

External links
 

K-Love radio stations